Suborno Express (Train no. 701/702) is an intercity train of Bangladesh Railway which runs between Dhaka (capital of Bangladesh) and Chittagong. Suborno Express has been considered one of the prestigious trains since it is considered the first luxurious non-stop train of the country. The train connects capital Dhaka with Port City Chittagong of Bangladesh.

History 

Suborno Express made its 1st inaugural run on 14 April 1998 with allocated train no. 701 (up)/702 (down).  It was introduced as non stop inter-city train which offers luxurious and fast service. The train starts from Dhaka Railway Station since its inauguration. Suborno express gets the top priority on Bangladesh Railway network. It only gives stoppage at Dhaka Airport Station. Thus, the train is popular among the aristocrat people.

Schedule 
The train departs Chittagong railway station at 7:00am (Bangladesh Standard Time) and arrives Dhaka at 12:20pm. In return trip, it departs Dhaka at 4:30pm and arrives Chittagong at 9:50pm. Monday is the weekly holiday of this train.

Carriages 

The train currently runs with Indonesia made PT-Inka coaches. However, sometimes the train pulls up to 22 coaches if there is compelling demand.The train has 8 AC chair car,7 Non-AC chair car, Two dining car with attached guard brakes and one generator car. Prior to introducing Chinese coaches, the train ran with air braked Iranian coaches brake coaches. Later, due to maintenance problem, Iranian airbrake coaches were replaced with newly imported Chinese coaches in 2007.

Locomotive 
Suborno Express is hauled by a Class 3000 series Locomotive of Bangladesh Railway.

Passenger interest 
People usually travel Suborno Express for non stop service. The train has more AC carriages than any other Dhaka-Chittagong express trains. Suborno Express is popular among corporate figures as well.

Stoppages only Bimanbandor 
 Dhaka Bimanbandor

References

External links

Named passenger trains of Bangladesh
Transport in Chittagong